David Cullinane (born 4 July 1974) is an Irish Sinn Féin politician who has been a Teachta Dála (TD) for the Waterford constituency since the 2016 general election. He previously served as a Senator for the Labour Panel from 2011 to 2016.

Cullinane was born in Waterford in 1974. He was elected to Waterford City Council at the 2004 local elections and retained his seat at the 2009 local elections. He was married to Kathleen Funchion, who is a Sinn Féin TD for Carlow–Kilkenny.

He became a member of Seanad Éireann in April 2011, sitting as a Senator for the Labour Panel. The Irish Times described him in the Seanad as "a frequent, informed and often abrasive contributor across a wide range of areas, with a keen attention to the nuances of legislation".

He unsuccessfully contested the Waterford constituency at the 2002, 2007 and 2011 general elections, before winning a seat in 2016. He was re-elected in 2020, when his 20,596 first preference votes amounted to 1.95 quotas, and was the highest ever recorded in the constituency's history.

Cullinane drew criticism on election night when a 30-second video uploaded to Twitter showed him ending his election victory speech with the phrases "up the Republic, Up the Ra and Tiocfaidh ár lá". When questioned about the appropriateness of using these phrases associated with support for the IRA, Cullinane stated: "Yesterday was a very emotional day for me . . . It was a long count and obviously we were very excited and very proud of the vote we got yesterday in Waterford. The 30-second clip was part of a longer speech that I gave where I was reflecting back on the hunger strikes, reflecting back on the fact that Kevin Lynch stood in the Waterford constituency in 1981. He was someone who inspired me and inspired I think many republicans. The comments were made in that context."

See also 
 Families in the Oireachtas

References

External links
David Cullinane's page on the Sinn Féin website

1974 births
Living people
Alumni of Waterford Institute of Technology
Local councillors in County Waterford
Members of the 24th Seanad
Members of the 32nd Dáil
Members of the 33rd Dáil
People from Waterford (city)
Sinn Féin senators
Sinn Féin TDs (post-1923)
Spouses of Irish politicians